Tai O is a fishing town, partly located on an island of the same name, on the western side of Lantau Island in Hong Kong. The village name means large inlet, referring to outlet for the waterways (Tai O Creek and Tai O River) merges as it moves through Tai O.

Geography
On the southwest part of Lantau Island, Tai O River splits to the north (as Tai O Creek) and west and at this fork lies the island referred to as Tai O. Two pedestrian bridges cross the river on its northern and western forks. The village is located mostly on the banks of the river. The western and northern parts of the island facing the South China Sea are uninhabited.

History
Nearby archaeological sites date back to the Stone Age, but permanent, and verifiable, human settlement here is only three centuries old. Stories that would be impossible to substantiate have Tai O as the base of many smuggling and piracy operations, the inlets of the river providing excellent protection from the weather and a hiding place. In early 16th century, Tai O was once occupied shortly by Portuguese during the Battle of Tamão, the remains is known as Fan Kwai Tong (番鬼塘, "Foreign devil pond") today.

Tai O is one of five villages of Lantau that were resettled when the coastal restriction of the Great Clearance was lifted in 1669. The other villages are Tung Sai Chung, Lo Pui O, Shek Pik and Mui Wo.

At nearby Fan Lau, a fort was built in 1729 to protect shipping on the Pearl River. Smuggling of guns, tobacco, drugs and people remains a documented illegal activity both into and out of mainland China.

When the British came to Hong Kong, Tai O was known as a Tanka village. A naval engagement between British and USA naval forces against Chinese piracy was fought in 1855.

At the time of the 1911 census, the population of Shek Tsai Po of Tai O was 118; the number of males was 71. The population of Tai O, both land and boat based, was 7,661; the number of males was 4,318.

During and after the Chinese Civil War, Tai O became a primary entrypoint for illegal immigration for those escaping from the People's Republic of China. Some of these immigrants, mostly Cantonese, stayed in Tai O, and Tai O attracted people from other Hong Kong ethnic groups, including Hoklo (Hokkien) and Hakka.

Tai O has a history of salt production. In 1940, it was recorded that the Tai O salt marshes were covering  and that the production has amounted to 25,000 piculs (1,512 metric tons) in 1938.

Currently the fishing lifestyle is dying out. While many residents continue to fish, it barely provides a subsistence income. There is a public school on the island and most young people move away when they come of age. In 2000, a large fire broke out destroying many residences. The village is now mostly squatters huts and dilapidated stilt houses.

Points of interest

Heritage
Graded buildings in Tai O include:
 Yeung Hau Temple, built in 1699 (Declared Monument)
 Old Tai O Police Station (Grade II)
 Kwan Tai Temple, Kat Hing Back Street. Built in 1741. (Grade II)
 Tin Hau Temple, Kat Hing Back Street. Built in 1772, it is connected to the left of Kwan Tai Temple.
 Fong Bin Yuen. (Grade III)
 No. 23 Kat Hing Back Street. (Grade III)
 Shek Lun Kok, No. 33 Kat Hing Back Street. (Grade III)
 No. 46-48 Kat Hing Street, pre-war shophouses. (Grade III)
 Wing Hing Petrol Station, No. 99C Kat Hing Back Street. (Grade III)
Other historical buildings include:
 Hip Wo Se Hok, No. 151 Tai Ping Street, a former school.
 Hung Shing Temple, Shek Tsai Po Street. Built in 1746.

Tourism

Also known as the "Venice of Hong Kong", Tai O is a tourist spot for both foreigners and residents of other parts of Hong Kong, despite damage by a fire in July 2000. The pang uks, a kind of stilt house, built right over the waterway are still quite scenic. A cable ferry tended by local women used to be quite popular with visitors, but it was replaced with a steel pedestrian bridge in October 1996.

The traditional salted fish and shrimp paste are sold at storefronts in Tai O. For a small fee, some residents will take tourists out on their boats along the river and for short jaunts into the sea. Many tourists come to Tai O specifically to take these trips to see Chinese white dolphins, also known as "Pink Dolphins". It is also a good place to see the sunset.

Old Tai O Police Station, a Grade II historic building, has been turned into a boutique hotel called Tai O Heritage Hotel by Hong Kong Heritage Conservation Foundation. The hotel has nine rooms and a restaurant. The hotel has been open and operational since 2012.

Tai O Rural Committee Historic and Cultural Showroom, located within the centuries-old fishing village of Tai O, exhibits relics of the local community's past, including fishing tools and dismantled old structures. The showroom was founded by the Tai O Rural Committee and all the items in its collection were donated by local residents.

Education
There are two kindergartens, one primary school and one secondary school. They are CCC Tai O Primary School and Buddhist Fat Ho Memorial College.

Most of Lantau Island, Tai O included, is in Primary One Admission (POA) School Net 98, which contains multiple aided schools on Lantau Island, including two in Tung Chung; no government primary schools are in this net.

Transport

Tai O can be reached by bus (New Lantao Bus) from the following places:
 Mui Wo – Bus no. 1
 Tung Chung – Bus no. 11
 Ngong Ping – Bus no. 21

There are ferry piers on Tai O, close to Tai O Bus Terminus. It operates daily as the following routes connecting Tai O:
 Tuen Mun (Tuen Mun Ferry Pier) - service by Fortune Ferry
 Tung Chung (Tung Chung New Development Ferry Pier) - service by Fortune Ferry
 Sha Lo Wan - operated by Fortune Ferry

Notable People
 Cilla Kung, actress and singer; she was born and raised in Tai O.

In popular culture
A 1998 Hong Kong drama A Place of One's Own by TVB starring Adia Chan and Mariane Chan is set in Tai O.

A 2021 Hong Kong drama Ossan's Love (HK version) by ViuTV starring Edan Lui and Anson Lo is set in Tai O.

See also

 List of islands and peninsulas of Hong Kong
 List of villages in Hong Kong
 Battle of Ty-ho Bay (1855)
 Fu Shan
 Tung O Ancient Trail
 Leung Uk, a village in the vicinity of Tai O

References

Further reading
 Liu Tik-sang, Siu-woo Cheung, Tai O; Study of Local History, No. 2. Hong Kong: Joint Publishing Company Ltd., 2006. 
 Page on Tai O by The Economist
 History of the Salt Industry and Tai O
 Boat anchorage
 "Review of Egretries in Hong Kong", in Hong Kong Biodiversity, Issue No. 14 March 2007, pp. 1-6.

External links

 Delineation of area of existing village Kat Hing Back Street (Tai O) for election of resident representative (2019 to 2022)
 Delineation of area of existing village Kat Hing Street (Tai O) for election of resident representative (2019 to 2022)
 Delineation of area of existing village Nam Tong Sun Tsuen (Tai O) for election of resident representative (2019 to 2022)
 Delineation of area of existing village Shek Tsai Po (East) (Tai O) for election of resident representative (2019 to 2022)
 Delineation of area of existing village Shek Tsai Po (West) (Tai O) for election of resident representative (2019 to 2022)
 Delineation of area of existing village Tai O Country Side (Tai O) for election of resident representative (2019 to 2022)
 Delineation of area of existing village Tai O Market Street (Tai O) for election of resident representative (2019 to 2022)
 Delineation of area of existing village Tai O Tai Ping Street (I) (Tai O) for election of resident representative (2019 to 2022)
 Delineation of area of existing village Tai O Tai Ping Street (II) (Tai O) for election of resident representative (2019 to 2022)
 Delineation of area of existing village Tai O Wing On Street (I) (Tai O) for election of resident representative (2019 to 2022)
 Delineation of area of existing village Tai O Wing On Street (II) (Tai O) for election of resident representative (2019 to 2022)

 
Islands of Hong Kong
Populated places in Hong Kong